St Matthew's Church is a Church of England church on Dyson Road in West Ham, east London. It originated in 1891 as a mission of All Saints Church, West Ham, designed to serve the area between West Ham Park and Romford Road. A permanent building was put up in 1896 and a separate parish formed the following year. It opened a mission of its own around 1900 in Vicarage Lane, which was destroyed by the London Blitz.

References 

West Ham
Church of England church buildings in West Ham
1891 establishments in England
1896 establishments in England
19th-century Church of England church buildings